Hao Yonghe (born 29 December 1989 in Shenyang, Liaoning) is a Chinese football player.

Club career
In 2010, Hao Yonghe started his professional footballer career with Shenyang Dongjin in the China League One. 

On 23 February 2012, Hao transferred to Chinese Super League side Liaoning Whowin. 

He would eventually make his league debut for Liaoning on 14 July 2013 in a game against Tianjin Teda, coming on as a substitute for Wu Gaojun in the 64th minute.

On 23 January 2013, Hao moved to China League One side Shenyang Zhongze on a one-year loan deal.

Club career statistics 

Statistics accurate as of match played 4 November 2013

References

1989 births
Living people
Chinese footballers
Footballers from Shenyang
Shenyang Dongjin players
Liaoning F.C. players
Association football midfielders
Chinese Super League players
China League One players